is the first album recorded by the Los Angeles-based Toshiko Akiyoshi – Lew Tabackin Big Band.  It was released in Japan by Victor in 1974 and received the Swing Journal Silver Disk prize for that year.  It was later released on RCA Victor in the USA and elsewhere and received a 1979 Grammy nomination for Best Jazz Instrumental Performance by a Big Band.

All tracks from this album are also included on the 2008 Mosaic 3 CD compilation, Mosaic Select: Toshiko Akiyoshi - Lew Tabackin Big Band.

Track listing
All songs composed and arranged by Toshiko Akiyoshi
LP side A
"Elegy" – 9:13
"Memory" – 10:24
LP side B
"Kogun" – 6:49
"American Ballad" – 5:49
"Henpecked Old Man" – 9:08

Personnel
Toshiko Akiyoshi – piano
Lew Tabackin – tenor saxophone
Tom Peterson – tenor saxophone
Dick Spencer – alto saxophone
Gary Foster – alto saxophone
Bill Perkins – baritone saxophone
Bobby Shew – trumpet
John Madrid – trumpet
Don Rader – trumpet
Mike Price – trumpet
Charles Loper – trombone
Jim Sawyer – trombone
Britt Woodman – trombone
Phil Teele – bass trombone
Gene Cherico – bass
Peter Donald – drums
Other
Scott Ellsworth – voice (on "Memory")

References / external links

RCA Victor Records RVC RCA-6246
[ Allmusic]
 1974 Swing Journal (Japanese jazz magazine) Silver Disk award (Japanese link)

Toshiko Akiyoshi – Lew Tabackin Big Band albums
1974 albums